"Éxtasis" is a song recorded by the Spanish singer-songwriter Pablo Alborán. The song was released as the fourth single from his second studio album Tanto (2012). It was released in 27 August 2013 as a digital download in Spain. The single peaked at number 16 on the Spanish Singles Chart in December 2013.

Music video
The official music video for "Éxtasis" was released on 26 August 2013.

Track listing

Chart performance
"Éxtasis" debuted at number 25 on the Spanish singles chart for the week commencing 1 September 2013, before reaching number 16 in December 2013.

Weekly charts

Release history

References

2013 singles
2012 songs
Pablo Alborán songs
Warner Music Spain singles
Songs written by Pablo Alborán